Panfilovo is a rural locality (a village) in Yurovskoye Rural Settlement, Gryazovetsky District, Vologda Oblast, Russia. The population was 254 as of 2002.

Geography 
Panfilovo is located 28 km northwest of Gryazovets (the district's administrative centre) by road. Neverovo is the nearest rural locality.

References 

Rural localities in Gryazovetsky District